Norje is a locality situated in Sölvesborg Municipality, Blekinge County, Sweden with 657 inhabitants in 2010.

Since 1998, Norje has been the location of the Sweden Rock Festival.

References 

Populated places in Sölvesborg Municipality